Paul Read is a recording engineer and music producer. He started his professional recording career at Rockfield Studios where he became a house engineer.

Some of his most successful work as recording engineer includes Nigel Kennedy’s string arrangements for the Donovan album ‘Sutras’ (produced by Rick Rubin), Catatonia, including sessions for ‘International Velvet’ (3× platinum) and Coldplay ‘Parachutes’ (9× platinum).

Read is quoted in the book Rock Legends at Rockfield, talking about recording sessions for the Coldplay album Parachutes

Paul Read is now Head of Department of Media and Music Technology at The Royal National College for the Blind in Hereford.

References

Living people
Year of birth missing (living people)
Place of birth missing (living people)
British audio engineers